Archbishop Savarinathan Michael Augustine (12 June 1933 – 4 November 2017) was an Indian prelate of the Roman Catholic Church. He served as the sixth Archbishop of the Roman Catholic Archdiocese of Pondicherry and Cuddalore from 1992 to 2004. He is an honorary member of Society of Foreign Missions of Paris. He served the church for 39 years as a bishop and for 56 years as a priest. He died on 4 November 2017 at the age of 84.

Augustine was sometimes referred to as the "People's Bishop", and "Bishop of the poor." He was fluent in English, French, Tamil, and Latin. He was a Tamil scholar, as well as a lyricist, poet, writer, singer, pianist, magician and artist.

Early life
Augustine started his school career at Petit Seminaire Higher Secondary School, Pondicherry. He joined the minor seminary at St. Agnes Seminary, Cuddalore. He graduated from St. Joseph's College, Tiruchirapalli and did his philosophical and theological studies at St.Peter's Pontifical Seminary, in Bangalore. He was ordained a priest for Archdiocese of Pondicherry and Cuddalore on 15 April 1961 by Monsignor Ambrose, then Archbishop of Pondicherry and Cuddalore at Immaculate Conception Cathedral, Pondicherry. After ordination, he was appointed as Sous — Director of Petit Seminaire Higher Secondary School, Pondicherry. Fr. Michael Augustine later went to Paris for higher studies in philosophy at l'Institut Catholique de Paris, France and obtained his licentiate in philosophy. On his return to India in 1965, he was appointed a professor of philosophy at St. Peter’s Pontifical Seminary in Bangalore. He later earned his doctorate on Indian Philosophy. Within a year, he became vice-rector at St. Peter's Pontifical Seminary, the office he remained until he became rector of the same seminary.

Ministry

In 1974, Pope Paul VI appointed him as the Rector of St. Peter's Pontifical Seminary, Bangalore. He stayed there until 1978 when he was consecrated as the Auxiliary Bishop of Madras and Mylapore. On 30 January 1978, Pope Paul VI appointed Father Michael Augustine as the Auxiliary Bishop of Madras and Mylapore to assist Archbishop Arullappa and bestowed upon him the titular see of Barrus. He was consecrated a bishop by then-Archbishop Duraisamy Simon Lourdusamy (later Cardinal) the then Secretary of the Congregation for the Evangelization of Peoples on 29 March 1978. He was appointed as bishop of the Vellore on 10 July 1981 by Pope John Paul II. Pope John Paul II appointed Bishop Michael Augustine as the Metropolitan Archbishop of Pondicherry and Cuddalore on 25 June 1992. He received the pallium from his predecessor, Archbishop Emeritus Venmani S. Selvanather, at the Cathedral of Pondicherry Archdiocese. On 10 June 2004, he voluntarily resigned as the Archbishop of the Archdiocese of Pondicherry and Cuddalore (India), citing medical reasons.

Episcopal ministry at Archdiocese of Madras-Mylapore (1978–81)
On 30 January 1978, Pope Paul VI appointed Father Michael Augustine as the Auxiliary Bishop of Madras-Mylapore Archdiocese to assist Archbishop Arullappa and bestowed upon him the titular see of Barrus. He was consecrated a bishop at the age of 45 years by then-Archbishop Duraisamy Simon Lourdusamy (later Cardinal) with co-consecrators Archbishop Venmani S. Selvanather of Pondicherry and Archbishop Anthony Rayappa Arulappa of Madras as on 29 March 1978, the episcopal ordination mass was attended by many bishops from Tamil Nadu, Karnataka and Pondicherry regions and many priests and laity attended. He chose "FIAT", meaning "Let Lord's will be done", as his Episcopal motto. Under the guidance of Archbishop Arullappa, Bishop Michael Augustine learnt many things and served as an auxiliary bishop for nearly 3 years.

Episcopal ministry at Diocese of Vellore (1981–92)
On 19 June 1981, Most. Rev. Dr S. Michael Augustine, till then Auxiliary Bishop of Madras-Mylapore, was appointed by the Pope John Paul II as the fourth Bishop of the Diocese of Vellore. The installation service took place on 24 July 1981 at 6 p.m. in the Cathedral Campus at Vellore.

Bishop S. Michael Augustine was the Bishop of Vellore for 10 years and 11 months. During his tenure of office, about 100 churches and chapels were built; seven new parishes were erected, six convents and dispensaries and three high schools were opened, and five elementary schools were upgraded to middle schools.

He noticed that many Catholics do not hold high positions. To improve this, he started summer coaching classes for the students who finished school. These coaching classes helped many people get into medicine, nursing, engineering and other technical training. He also established a scholarship fund for professional studies. He believed children should have a strong foundation in their education, so he started coaching classes for high school children. The coaching classes were conducted for a month. The whole expenses were met by the projects and Diocesan contributions.

To foster local vocations, he started a minor seminary at Pathiavaram. As the Tamil Nadu Bishops decided to have the college education as minimum qualification for major seminary admission, a seminary was started at Koviloor so that the students can attend Sacred Heart College, Tirupattur. He was transferred and promoted as Archbishop of Pondicherry and Cuddalore on 24 March 1992. He remained administrator of Vellore Diocese till 25 June 1992.

Episcopal ministry at Archdiocese of Pondicherry and Cuddalore (1992–2004)
Pope John Paul II elevated Bishop Michael Augustine of Vellore as Archbishop of Pondicherry and Cuddalore on 18 February 1992 and he was installed as Archbishop of Pondicherry and Cuddalore on 25 June 1992.During his 12 years of episcopacy, he laid foundations for 2 new vicariates and 14 new parishes, and he invited 13 new religious congregations to work in the Archdiocese.

After 12 years of pastoral care in Pondicherry, he submitted his resignation citing medical reasons and Pope John Paul II accepted his resignation from the Metropolitan See of Pondicherry and Cuddalore on 10 June 2004. However, he remained as the Apostolic Administrator of the Archdiocese until 5 July 2004, the day of the canonical possession of his successor.

Post retirement
After his retirement as Archbishop of Pondicherry and Cuddalore, Archbishop Michael Augustine stayed in his retirement home which is behind Holy Family Church, Keezhputhupattu in the outskirts of Pondicherry near Kalapet. During these years, Fr.A.J.C Lawrence (his nephew and clergy of Pondicherry) also helped him.

He composed two books of Psalms during this period namely "The Psalm of a Priest" and "The Psalm of a Bishop."

Death and funeral
In September 2017, he was admitted in  "Be Well Hospital", Pondicherry but was later discharged and was taking rest in the Archbishop’s House. On 4 November 2017, the morning after he complained of uneasiness to his helper, he was rushed to the hospital where he died at 9:50 a.m. when Archbishop Anandarayar completed the prayer by making the sign of the cross in the presence of Fr.A.J.C. Lawrence.

His remains were immediately embalmed in PIMS, Pondicherry and was taken first to his retirement home where Eucharist was celebrated following which his remains were brought to the Archbishop's House in Pondicherry and kept there until 6 p.m. His remains were then transferred to Escande Hall in Petit Seminaire Higher Secondary School, Pondicherry at 6:30 p.m. for public veneration. Massive crowds poured in to pay tribute and last respects. Archbishop George Antonysamy of Madras, Bishop Peter Abir of Sulthanpet, Bishop Antony Devotta of Trichy, Bishop Emeritus Peter Remigius of Kottar visited, prayed and paid their last respects. His remains remained there until 9:50 a.m. on 6 November 2017.

Several Archbishops, Bishops, Priests, religious laity and people of other faith attended his funeral on 6 November 2017. The funeral procession began from Petit Seminaire School and ended in the Cathedral of Pondicherry. The Requiem Mass was presided by Archbishop Anandarayar of Pondicherry. Several Bishops concelebrated, namely Archbishop Emeritus Chinnappa of Madras, Archbishop Antony Pappusamy of Madurai, Bishop Yuvon Ambrose of Tuticorin, Bishop Singaroyan of Salem, Bishop Soundarajan of Vellore, Bishop Thomas Aquinas of Coimbatore, Bishop Amalraj of Ooty, Bishop Lawrence Pius of Dharmapuri, Bishop Neethinathan of Chengalpet, Bishop Devadass Ambrose of Thanjavur, Bishop Antonysamy of Kumbakonam, Bishop Paulsamy of Dindigul, Bishop Jude Paulraj of Palayamkottai and Bishop Susaimaanikam of Sivagangai.

During the funeral mass, Bishop Sebastianappan Singaroyan (student of Archbishop Michael Augustine at St.Peter's Pontifical Seminary, Bangalore) preached a sermon on the sanctity, sincerity and love of Archbishop Michael Augustine and on his life of FIAT.

After the funeral mass, Archbishop Chinnappa sung in Latin the final rites inside the cathedral. The eulogy was read by Archbishop Antony Pappusamy, Bishop Soundarajan, Archbishop Anandarayar, CRI President of Pondicherry, Fr. Arulselvam Rayappan of St. Peter's Pontifical Seminary and by the Vicar General of Madras-Mylapore Archdiocese. His remains were then carried to the clergy cemetery in the cathedral where his nephew Fr. A.J.C. Lawrence blessed the new cemetery and the remains of his uncle. He was then laid to rest there.

Gallery

See also
 Archbishop Michael Augustine at catholic-hierarchy.org
 Archbishop Michael Augustine at Vellore Diocese

References

|-

|-

1933 births
2017 deaths
20th-century Roman Catholic archbishops in India
21st-century Roman Catholic archbishops in India
20th-century Indian Roman Catholic theologians
Roman Catholic archbishops of Pondicherry and Cuddalore